The 1918–19 season was the first season played by the team as the Sphas (they competed the previous year as Philadelphia YMHA), and the team's second season in the minor-league American League of Philadelphia. Game-by-game records not available for this season.

References

Philadelphia Sphas seasons